Mali Orehek is a settlement in the foothills of the Gorjanci range in the City Municipality of Novo Mesto in southeastern Slovenia. The area is part of the traditional region of Lower Carniola and is now included in the Southeast Slovenia Statistical Region.

The local church is dedicated to Saint Andrew and belongs to the Parish of Stopiče. It was built in the 19th century on the site of an earlier church.

References

External links
Mali Orehek on Geopedia

Populated places in the City Municipality of Novo Mesto